The ʿUthmāniyya Madrasa is a historic school in Jerusalem. 
It is by the western esplanade of the al-Aqsa Compound. 
It was established in 1436, then became an Ottoman imperial provincial madrasa.

It is among the few Jerusalem madrasas with a woman endower, the others were the Khātūniyya Madrasa and the little-known Barudiyya.

History 

The school was founded in the Mamluk era, before the Ottomans began ruling Jerusalem.
Its endower was a woman from the Ottoman lands, .
She was a wife of Çandarlı Ibrahim Pasha the Elder, of the Çandarlı family. She came from a distinguished family, being a direct descendant of Sheikh Edebali. 
She stipulated that the income from 10 villages in Anatolia should go to the endowment for the madrasa. She died in 1436 or 1437, and was buried in her madrasa.

Ottoman era
A  defter written soon after 1540, in the early Ottoman era,  noted that  Kafr Qara was the only Palestinian endowment for the school.  The whole of the revenue of Kafr Qara, a total of   3,400 aspers annually,  belonged to this endowment.

By the late 1500s, it became an  imperial provincial madrasa, ie, the imperial Ottoman court appointed its Hanafi muftis. This was probably due  to the  Çandarlı family's close relationship with the Ottoman Empire. Hence, the Banu Abi al-Lutf family, which dominated the Jerusalem  mufti position, also came to dominate the leadership of this madrasa.

In 1656, the mudarris Ali Effendi al-Lutfi requested permission to make necessary repairs. A reference early in the century is to it having 9 students (talaba).

The school operated for at least four centuries. In the 18th century, the building became a private residence.<ref name=Burgoyne547

Name 
Although the name literally means "the Ottoman School", it might not have been its original meaning. During the era when the school's name was recorded, it was extremely rare for Ottoman subjects who were not actual members of the House of Osman to be called . (They were instead called Rūmi.)

Other researchers note that  might be her nisba name, and that it is possible that she was descended from or related to someone named .

Description 

It consists of two storeys.
On the ground floor, there is from north to south along the Haram side: first a tomb chamber, then a courtyard, then the "lower mosque".

On the upper floor, above the portico there is a distinctive double-arched loggia room, with a room to the north which used to be domed. 
On the eastern façade, the loggia's arches are topped by s.
To the south of the loggia room is an assembly hall. All of the rooms on the upper floor were originally to be reached only through the assembly hall.

Its roof has a small pale-turquoise dome.

Epigraphy 

An inscription on the madrasa reads:

In the name of God, the Merciful, the Compassionate. The construction of this blessed madrasa was ordered by the noble and honorable Lady Isfahan Shah Khatun, the daughter of the late Amir Mahmud, al-ʿUthmaniyya, known as khanum (may God show her His benevolence). She passed away in the year 840 [1436–37 CE]. Its construction was completed at the close of the aforementioned year through the efforts of Khawaja Jamiʿ, son of Sati, from Asia Minor [al-Rūmī].Moudjir ed-dyn, 1876, p.  144van Berchem, 1925, plate LXXV

Environs 

Its first storey is west of the compound's west wall's  (arcade), which includes the Ablution Gate (and the Cotton Merchants' Gate farther north).
Beyond the riwaq, to its east, is the Fountain of Qayt Bay.

To its north is Zuqāq Bāb al-Maṭhara (a short alley), leading to the Ablution Gate in the east. Across the alley is Ribāṭ az-Zamanī, a ribat. 
And farther north, across the Cotton Merchants' Market, is Khātūniyya Madrasa.

To its south is al-Baladiyya Madrasa, and to its southwest al-Ashrafiyya Madrasa.

References

Bibliography

External links
Al-Madrasa Al-’Uthmaniyya

Schools in Jerusalem
1436 establishments